The Women's field hockey Qualifying Tournaments for the 2008 Summer Olympics was a qualification tournament that determined the final three spots for the 2008 Summer Olympics. The qualifying tournament, which involved 18 teams divided into three groups, with three separate qualifying tournaments, was held in Azerbaijan, Russia and Canada, at different times in 2008. Only the following winners of each qualifying tournament earned a berth in the 2008 Summer Olympics: Spain, United States, and South Korea.

Teams
Below is a list of the 18 teams participating in this qualifying tournament:

In addition, the International Hockey Federation also named three reserve teams after two of the above teams failed to make it in this qualifying tournament (two of them already confirmed to be in the reserve list):

 (replace Chinese Taipei in Qualifying 2)
 (replace Cuba in Qualifying 3)

Squads

Qualifying 1
Qualifying 1 was held from 12 to 20 April 2008 in Baku, Azerbaijan.

Pool

Players for the Kenyan team are back in the tournament after recently withdrawing due to political turmoil in their country.

All times local (UTC+5)

Classification

Fifth and sixth

Third and fourth

Final

Awards

Qualifying 2
Qualifying 2 was held from 19 to 27 April 2008 in Kazan, Russia.

Pool

All times are Russia Summer Time (UTC+4)

Classification

Fifth and sixth

Third and fourth

Final

Awards

Qualifying 3
Qualifying 3 was held from 26 April to 4 May 2008 in Victoria, British Columbia, Canada.

Venue
University of Victoria

Pool

All times are Canada Time (UTC-7)

Classification

Fifth and sixth

Third and fourth

Final

Awards

References

External links
Official website (Qualifying 1)
Official website (Qualifying 2)
Official website (Qualifying 3)

2008
 
2008 Summer Olympics
2008 Summer Olympics
2008 Summer Olympics
2008 in women's field hockey
April 2008 sports events
May 2008 sports events
Sport in Kazan
21st century in Kazan
Sports competitions in Victoria, British Columbia
Sports competitions in Baku
2000s in Baku
2008 in British Columbia
2008 in Azerbaijani sport
2008 in Russian women's sport
2008 in Canadian women's sports
21st century in Victoria, British Columbia